Steve Burkholder was the Republican mayor of Lakewood, Colorado from 1999 to 2007. He was re-elected to a second term as mayor in November 2003 after serving a previous term on City Council. In 2007 he was term limited. He is the owner of the A&S Group, a marketing and consulting organization. He was succeeded as mayor by Bob Murphy.

Burkholder has an undergraduate degree from the University of Colorado at Boulder. He is also a graduate of the Senior Executives in State and Local Government Program at the John F. Kennedy School of Government, Harvard University.

References

Colorado city council members
Colorado Republicans
Mayors of places in Colorado
Living people
Year of birth missing (living people)